János Salamon Petényi, Johann Salomon von Petényi  or Ján Šalamún Petian (30 July 1799 – 5 October 1855) was a Hungarian priest who took an interest in zoology, travelling, collecting specimens, and contributing to ornithology, speleology, and paleontology. He is considered the father of Hungarian ornithology. 

Petényi was born in Ábelfalva, Nógrád megye where his father was Lutheran pastor Gábor Petényi who was known for his work in orientalism. Schooled in Losonc and Selmec he took an interest in collecting objects of natural history. He also influenced Agoston Kubinyi. He followed the family tradition to become a pastor, studying in Bratislava and Vienna while also attending the botanical lectures of Nikolaus Joseph von Jacquin, meeting Johann Jakob Heckel and Johann Natterer from whom he learned taxidermy and specimen preparation. He corresponded with Christian Ludwig Brehm and Johann Friedrich Naumann and in 1826 became a pastor in Czinkota. In 1833 he moved to Pest and in 1834 he became curator of the zoological collections at the Hungarian National Museum. Around 1840 Gustav Hartlaub visited him and Hartlaub apparently did not like him for reasons unclear. In 1847 he examined fossilized remains in the karst of Beremend. He also examined caves in the Bihor Mountains. He was elected to the Hungarian Academy of Sciences in 1846. Accidental absorption and toxicity from arsenic soap used as a preservative in his taxidermy work led to his early death. His main work on birds was completed and translated to German from his manuscripts by Titus Csörgey with a biographical preface by Otto Herman.

Eponymy
Many species of fossil and extant animals have been named after him including: 
Prodeinotherium petenyii, 
The Romanian barbel fish Barbus petenyi, 
Villanyia petenyii, and 
The extinct Vole, Mimomys petenyii.

References

External links 

 Ornithologische Fragmente Aus Den Handschriften Von Johann Salamon Von Petenyi (1905)

1799 births
1855 deaths
Hungarian zoologists
Deaths from arsenic poisoning